Henry John Gillespie, D.D. was an Anglican priest in Ireland in the 20th-century.

Gillespie was  educated at Trinity College, Dublin and ordained in 1876.  After a curacy in Roscrea he held incumbencies at Dunkerrin, Castletownarra, Finnoe and Kiltenanlea. He was Dean of Killaloe from 1917 until 1936.

Notes

Alumni of Trinity College Dublin
Deans of Killaloe
20th-century Irish Anglican priests